Canyon Raiders is a 1951 American Western film directed by Lewis D. Collins and starring Whip Wilson, Fuzzy Knight and Phyllis Coates.

Cast
Whip Wilson as Whip Wilson
Fuzzy Knight as Texas Milburn
Jim Bannon as Jim Bannon
Phyllis Coates as Alice Long
I. Stanford Jolley as Sam Wellman
Barbara Woodell as Ruth Milburn
Marshall Reed as henchman Jack Marlin
Riley Hill as henchman Lou Banks

References

External links

1951 Western (genre) films
American Western (genre) films
Films directed by Lewis D. Collins
Monogram Pictures films
Films scored by Raoul Kraushaar
American black-and-white films
1950s English-language films
1950s American films